Glenea arida is a species of beetle in the family Cerambycidae. It was described by James Thomson in 1865.

Subspecies
 Glenea arida alluaudi Breuning, 1958
 Glenea arida arida Thomson, 1865

References

arida
Beetles described in 1865